Ricardo Guardia Ávila (born 4 February 1997) is a Panamanian footballer who plays as a midfielder for Veraguas C.D., and the Panama national team.

Club career
Born in Panama City, Ávila started his career at Chorrillo in 2014, making 39 appearances and scoring five goals in the Liga Panameña over the course of two-and-a-half seasons. On 29 August 2016, he was sent on loan to Slovenian club Koper, but made no official appearances before returning to Chorrillo in early 2017. On 1 July 2017, he joined Belgian club Gent, being assigned to the reserve squad.

On 24 January 2019, Ávila joined USL Championship side Real Monarchs on loan for their 2019 season.

International career
Ávila represented the Panama under-20 side at the 2017 CONCACAF U-20 Championship.

He made his debut for the senior team in 2016. He was named in Panama's squad for the 2018 World Cup in Russia.

Career statistics

International

References

External links

1997 births
Living people
Panamanian footballers
Panama international footballers
Unión Deportivo Universitario players
FC Koper players
K.A.A. Gent players
Real Monarchs players
USL Championship players
Slovenian PrvaLiga players
Liga Panameña de Fútbol players
Association football midfielders
Panamanian expatriate footballers
Panamanian expatriate sportspeople in Slovenia
Expatriate footballers in Slovenia
Panamanian expatriate sportspeople in Belgium
Expatriate footballers in Belgium
Sportspeople from Panama City
2018 FIFA World Cup players
Panama under-20 international footballers
Veraguas Club Deportivo players